Susana Beatriz Decibe is an Argentine sociologist who has also served as the Minister of Education (1996–99).

Early life
Born in Bragado on 7 August 1949, Decibe is a cousin of comedian . After finishing her schooling, Decibe attended the University of Buenos Aires, from where she earned her degree in sociology. She did her Masters from Latin American Social Sciences Institute (FLACSO).

Career
During the 1976 Argentine coup d'état, she was detained at the Navy Petty-Officers School of Mechanics (ESMA). Decibe became an advisor to the Argentine Chamber of Deputies's Education Commission in 1989. In 1996, she was appointed minister of education, the third one during the presidency of Carlos Menem. Her predecessor  had suggested her name to Menem. However, she resigned from her office in 1999, as a protest to government's reduction in education budget.  succeeded her.

Personal life
Decibe married a company executive with whom she had four children. The couple separated in 2002.

References

1949 births
Living people
Argentine sociologists
Women government ministers of Argentina
University of Buenos Aires alumni
Argentine ministers of education
Argentine women sociologists
Argentine women scientists
People from Buenos Aires Province